Alfred Clas (1859 - 1942) was an architect in Milwaukee, Wisconsin. He was a partner in the firm Ferry & Clas with George Bowman Ferry and in 1913 Alfred C. Clas partnered with his son Reuben F. Clas and with John S. Shepherd, as junior partners, to form the firm of Clas, Shepherd & Clas.  Shepherd withdrew in 1931 and the firm became Clas & Clas, Inc., with Alfred Clas remaining president until his death in 1942.

Clas was born in Sauk City, Wisconsin. He and Ferry were responsible for much of the city planning and development that was happening at the time. Clas was a City Planner and a member of City Park Board and designed the Milwaukee Auditorium and other public buildings.

The City of Milwaukee commemorated a park in Clas's name in appreciation of his work as a city planner. Alfred C. Clas Park is located in Milwaukee County, just off N. 9th St and Wells St (Latitude: 43.0405556, Longitude: -87.9238889).

He partnered with Ferry from 1890 until Ferry 1912.

Clas Park on the southern side of the Milwaukee County Courthouse is named for him.

He was a member of the American Institute of Architects.

The Pabst Mansion at 2000 West Wisconsin Avenue in Milwaukee was the first project of the Ferry & Clas partnership and was completed in 1892.

In 1912 his A Scheme for the Improvement of the Milwaukee River was published. His speech Civic Improvement in Milwaukee, Wisconsin; An Address Delivered before the Greater Milwaukee Association, December 14, 1916 was also published.

The Milwaukee Public Library has a portrait of him.

Works
For works by the partnership with George Ferry see Ferry and Clas

Freethinkers' Hall (1884), 309 Polk St., Sauk City, Wisconsin NRHP-listed
Bernard Joseph Eiring House (1888)
Emanuel and Clara Adler House (1888), 1681 N. Prospect Ave., Milwaukee, aka Emanuel D. Adler House, NRHP-listed
Saint James Court Apartments (1895 design, built in 1903)
Midsummer Carnival Shaft (1900)
Alfred C. Clas Home at 2348 N. Terrace Avenue in Milwauke (his house in retirement).
Peter and Mattie Reiss House (1906) in Sheboygan, Wisconsin
Lake Park pavilion (1908) in Milwaukee
Sauk City High School (1916) at 713 Madison St. NRHP listed
Earle House (1924) in Sarasota, Florida
Crisp Building (1926) at 1970 Main Street in Sarasota, Florida. NRHP listed (Clas & Shepard) Shepherd?
Hotel Whiting (1923), now the Whiting Place Apartments, at 1408 Strongs Avenue in Stevens Point, Wisconsin
Columbus Fireman's Park Complex, 1049 Park Ave. Columbus, WI NRHP listed
Tripoli Temple (1928) in Milwaukee, Wisconsin (Clas, Shepherd & Clas)
Hutchinson Memorial Library (1936) at 228 N. High St. Randolph, WI Clas & Clas, Inc.  NRHP listed (Clas & Clas Inc.)
Milwaukee Hospital, 2200 W. Kilbourn Ave. Milwaukee, WI Clas, Shepartd & Clas, et al. NRHP listed
Milwaukee Hospital West Wing, 2200 W. Kilbourn Ave., Milwaukee, WI (Clas, Shepard & Clas, et al.) NRHP-listed

References

External links

20th-century American architects
19th-century American architects
1859 births
1942 deaths
Architects from Milwaukee
People from Sauk City, Wisconsin